Cambridge Aerodrome , also known as Cambridge Airport, is a minor airport located in Cambridge, a suburb of Hobart, Tasmania, Australia. It is located only a few kilometres from the primary airport, Hobart International Airport.

Cambridge has been the primary site of aeronautics in Hobart from its opening in the 1920s. In July 1934, the federal government compulsorily acquired  of land from a local farmer to establish an aerodrome on the current site. It served as Hobart's main airport until the International Airport opened in 1956. Today, it is the base of Par Avion, which specialises in day trips and scenic flights around Hobart and the South West Wilderness of Tasmania; the Aeroclub of Southern Tasmania; and Heli Resources, a Helicopter Company that focuses on aerial work and flights in Antarctica.

Accidents and incidents

On 10 March 1946, a Douglas DC-3 aircraft operated by Australian National Airways departed from Cambridge Aerodrome with a crew of 4 and 21 passengers for Essendon Airport. Less than 2 minutes after take-off, the aircraft crashed at Seven-Mile Beach, killing all on board. At the time, it was Australia's worst civil aviation accident.

Airlines and destinations

See also
 List of airports in Tasmania

References

External links
 Historical airports in Australia including Cambridge Aerodrome
Information about Cambridge Aerodrome

Landmarks in Hobart
Airports in Tasmania
Transport in Hobart
Airports established in 1934
City of Clarence
1934 establishments in Australia